Massimo Mariotti (born 22 November 1961) is a retired Swiss footballer.

External links

1961 births
Living people
Swiss men's footballers
MSV Duisburg players
2. Bundesliga players
Association football defenders
People from Biel/Bienne
Sportspeople from the canton of Bern